Yesaqi (also Romanized as Yesāqī) is a village in Sadan Rostaq-e Sharqi Rural District, in the Central District of Kordkuy County, Golestan Province, Iran. At the 2006 census, its population was 4,490, in 1,150 families.

References 

Populated places in Kordkuy County